Norfolk is a county in East Anglia. The top level of local government is Norfolk County Council with seven second tier councils: Breckland District Council, Broadland District Council, Great Yarmouth Borough Council, King's Lynn and West Norfolk Borough Council, North Norfolk District Council, Norwich City Council and South Norfolk District Council. The county is bounded by Cambridgeshire, Suffolk, Lincolnshire and the North Sea.

Local nature reserves (LNRs) are designated by local authorities under the National Parks and Access to the Countryside Act 1949. The local authority must have a legal control over the site, by owning or leasing it or having an agreement with the owner. Local nature reserves are sites which have a special local interest either biologically or geologically. Local authorities have a duty to care for them, and can apply local bye-laws to manage and protect them.

As of October 2018, there are 27 LNRs in Norfolk, seven of which are Sites of Special Scientific Interest, three are Special Areas of Conservation, three are Special Protection Areas, one is a Ramsar site, one is a Geological Conservation Review site, one is a Nature Conservation Review site, one is a Scheduled Monument, two are managed by the Norfolk Wildlife Trust and one by the Suffolk Wildlife Trust.

Key

Other classifications

GCR = Geological Conservation Review
NCR = Nature Conservation Review site
NWT = Norfolk Wildlife Trust
Ramsar = Ramsar site, an internationally important wetland site
SAC = Special Area of Conservation

SM = Scheduled monument
SPA = Special Protection Area under the European Union Directive on the Conservation of Wild Birds
 SSSI = Site of Special Scientific Interest
SWT = Suffolk Wildlife Trust

Sites

See also
List of Sites of Special Scientific Interest in Norfolk
Norfolk Wildlife Trust

Notes

References

Sources

 
Norfolk
Norfolk-related lists